All About Jesus is the debut studio album from Christian pop singer Charmaine. It was released on August 13, 2002 by both Elevate Music and Inpop Records. The album was produced by Jeremy Bose, David Das, Chris Estes, Ainslie Grosser, Jamie Moore and Otto Price.

Critical reception

At Jesus Freak Hideout, John DiBiase rated the album three-and-a-half stars out of five, calling this "impressive". Phil Thomson of Cross Rhythms rated the album nine squares out of ten, remarking how "this is definitely the best of its kind I have heard in years." At Christianity Today, Russ Breimeier rated the album two stars out of five, indicating how the release contains a "lack of creativity".

Track listing

References

2002 debut albums
Inpop Records albums
Charmaine (musician) albums